Celebration of Life, also known as the Arthur Boke/Sarah Sullivan statue, is a 2004 bronze sculpture by Alfred Tibor, installed near Franklinton's Genoa Park, in Columbus, Ohio, United States. The artwork depicts a woman holding a baby above her head, and commemorates Arthur Boke, the first known black child born in Franklinton, and Sarah Sullivant, the wife of Lucas Sullivant. The Sullivants, a white couple, raised Boke as their own child.

See also

 2004 in art

References

External links
 
 

2004 establishments in Ohio
2004 sculptures
Bronze sculptures in Ohio
Franklinton (Columbus, Ohio)
Monuments and memorials in Ohio
Outdoor sculptures in Columbus, Ohio
Sculptures of African Americans
Sculptures of children in the United States
Sculptures of women in Ohio
Statues in Columbus, Ohio